Jazzi Barnum-Bobb (born 15 September 1995) is an English-born Saint Vincentian footballer who plays as a defender for Chelmsford City.

Club career

Early career
Born in Enfield, London, Barnum-Bobb was signed for Watford's academy, spending two years there before being released in 2014. During his time at Watford, he achieved 11 A* GCSE passes from the highly rated Harefield Academy in Uxbridge.

Cardiff City
After being released from Watford, Barnum-Bobb was signed by Cardiff City on a one-year junior contract by manager Ole Gunnar Solskjær in the summer of 2014. Barnum-Bobb made his debut for the club against Coventry City in the League Cup in August 2014. He started the match and played 66 minutes before being substituted for Mats Møller Dæhli as Cardiff won 2–1. On 13 October 2015 he joined Newport County on an initial one-month loan, subsequently extended until 7 January 2016. He made his Football League debut for Newport on 17 October 2015 in a League Two match versus Portsmouth. At the end of the 2015–16 season, Barnum-Bobb was not offered a new contract by Cardiff and was subsequently released.

Newport County
On 23 June 2016, it was announced that Barnum-Bobb would rejoin Newport County on a one-year contract. He scored his first senior career goal on 29 October 2016 for Newport County in a 3–1 win against Accrington Stanley. At the end of the 2016–17 season his contract was extended for a further year.

On 8 November 2017, Barnum-Bobb joined Torquay United on loan until January 2018. He was released by Newport on 21 February 2018.

Non-League
On 5 March 2018, Barnum-Bobb joined Chelmsford City.

In June 2019, Barnum-Bobb went on trial with Wrexham. On 22 July 2019, he signed a one-year deal with the Welsh club.

Ahead of the 2020–21 season, Barnum-Bobb signed for Dartford. The following season, Barnum-Bobb moved to fellow National League South outfit Dulwich Hamlet. On 2 July 2022, Barnum-Bobb re-signed for former club Chelmsford City.

International career
On 6 June 2022, Barnum-Bobb made his international debut, starting for Saint Vincent and the Grenadines in a 2–2 draw against Nicaragua.

Career statistics

References

External links

1995 births
Living people
Footballers from the London Borough of Enfield
English footballers
Association football defenders
Cardiff City F.C. players
Newport County A.F.C. players
Torquay United F.C. players
Chelmsford City F.C. players
Wrexham A.F.C. players
Dartford F.C. players
Dulwich Hamlet F.C. players
Black British sportspeople
English Football League players
National League (English football) players
English people of Saint Vincent and the Grenadines descent
Saint Vincent and the Grenadines international footballers